Carlos Antwan Moncrief (born November 3, 1988) is an American former professional baseball outfielder.

Early life and family
Carlos Antwan Moncrief was born in Jackson, Mississippi. His father, Homer, was drafted as a pitcher by the Detroit Tigers in the 1980 amateur draft; Homer advanced to Double-A in 1982 but was released two years later. He later played in an over-30 league.

Career

Cleveland Indians
Moncrief attended Hillcrest Christian School in Jackson, MS and Chipola Junior College. The Cleveland Indians selected him in the 14th round of the 2008 Major League Baseball draft as a pitcher. After he struggled in 2008 and 2009, Moncrief transitioned into an outfielder.

San Francisco Giants
He signed with the Giants organization as a free agent in 2016. He played for the Richmond Flying Squirrels of the Class AA Eastern League.

The Giants promoted Moncrief to the major leagues on July 26, 2017. He made his MLB debut on July 29, 2017, drawing a walk in his first plate appearance, which came against Los Angeles Dodgers reliever Luis Avilán. On July 31, 2017, Moncrief recorded his first career hit against the Oakland Athletics in the fourth inning.

Generales de Durango
On April 17, 2018, Moncrief signed with the Generales de Durango of the Mexican Baseball League. He was released on May 27, 2019.

Personal life
Moncrief and his wife, Brandy, have four sons.

References

External links

1988 births
Living people
African-American baseball players
Akron Aeros players
Akron RubberDucks players
American expatriate baseball players in Mexico
Águilas del Zulia players
Arizona League Indians players
Baseball players from Jackson, Mississippi
Carolina Mudcats players
Chipola Indians baseball players
Columbus Clippers players
Generales de Durango players
Gigantes de Carolina players
Gulf Coast Indians players
Kinston Indians players
Lake County Captains players
Mahoning Valley Scrappers players
Major League Baseball outfielders
Mayos de Navojoa players
Mexican League baseball left fielders
Mexican League baseball right fielders
Phoenix Desert Dogs players
Richmond Flying Squirrels players
Sacramento River Cats players
San Francisco Giants players
Scottsdale Scorpions players
21st-century African-American sportspeople
20th-century African-American people